Jean-Marc Routhier (born February 2, 1968) is a Canadian former professional ice hockey player who played eight games for the Quebec Nordiques of the National Hockey League.

Routhier was born in Quebec City, Quebec, Canada.

Career statistics

External links
 

1968 births
Living people
Canadian ice hockey right wingers
Halifax Citadels players
Hull Olympiques players
Ice hockey people from Quebec City
Quebec Nordiques draft picks
Quebec Nordiques players
Victoriaville Tigres players
French Quebecers